Mary Siezgle was a soldier of the Union Army in the American Civil War. Her service began as a nurse, but she joined her husband in the 44th New York Infantry disguised as a man. She was one of five women who are known to have participated as a combatant in the Battle of Gettysburg.

Legacy 
In 1915, the New York Times published an article about the service of Siezgle.

References 

Women in the American Civil War
American Civil War nurses
American women nurses